Georgianna K. Offutt (August 21, 1868 – 1949) was an American chiropodist, clubwoman, and suffragist, and the first vice-president of Alameda County League of Colored Women Voters.

Offutt was a practicing chiropodist in the Los Angeles area for twenty-five years. She was the president of the local Sojourner Truth Club, and, along with Emma Lou Sayers and Dr. Vada J. Somerville, helped create a voter education program for Black voters. She faced prejudice in medical circles and was outspoken about these difficulties; she wrote a newspaper article for the California Eagle called "Negro Woman in the Medical World" giving testimonials about the poor treatment she and other Black women received.

Early life
Offutt was born in St. Louis, Missouri. She attended Lincoln University in Jefferson City, and then worked as a teacher.  She married Roddum Kenner in 1890, with whom she had a son, Byron. Following Kenner's death in 1893, she moved to California. While in California, attended the College of Chiropody in San Francisco, California where she received a doctorate in Orthopedic and Surgical Chiropody in 1922. She married Roddum Kenner in 1890; he died in 1893 after which she moved to California. They had one son, Byron. In 1897 she married Boone Offutt; he died in 1935. They had one daughter, Ruby, in 1900.

References

1868 births
1949 deaths
American suffragists
African-American suffragists
20th-century African-American people
20th-century African-American women